Cesare I Gonzaga (1530 – 15 February 1575) was count of Guastalla from 1557 until his death. He was a member of the House of Gonzaga, the first-born son of the imperial condottiero Ferrante Gonzaga and Isabella di Capua. From the latter, he inherited also the title of Count of Amalfi. He was also Duke of Ariano and Prince of Molfetta. On 21 May 1558 he was appointed commander-in-chief of the troops in Lombardy by Philip II. On 12 March 1560 he married Camilla Borromeo (1536-1583), sister of Charles Borromeo and niece of Giovanni Angelo de' Medici, who had recently been elected Pope with the name of Pius IV.

Cesare Gonzaga was also a member of the Academy of the Vatican Nights, which met in the Casina Pio IV in the Vatican.

He founded the Accademia degli Invaghiti in Mantua, in the palace he inherited from his father.

In 1567–68 he moved his court from Mantua to Guastalla, where he remained until his death, employing Francesco da Volterra as his architect and engineer.

His mistress was Diana di Cordona.

His son Ferrante succeeded him in Guastalla.

Sources

1530 births
1575 deaths
Cesare 1
Cesare 1
Nobility of Mantua
16th-century Italian nobility
Dukes of Amalfi (Spanish title)